The Zeppelin Record is the fifth studio album by Dogbowl, released in September 1998 by Lithium Records. Released five years after 1993's Project Success, The Zeppelin Record marked the first time Dogbowl had not issued an album through Shimmy Disc and had gone without the collaborative aid of his brother Christopher Tunney and producer Kramer. Instead, he opted to produce the album himself in Paris, where he had been living with his wife and children.

Track listing

Personnel 
Adapted from The Zeppelin Record liner notes.

 Dogbowl – lead vocals, guitar, production
Musicians
 Boris Declerck – bass guitar
 Dominique Depret – guitar
 Race Age – drums, percussion
 Philippe Sirop – drums, percussion

Production and additional personnel
 Damien Bertrand – engineering
 Jean-Francois Marvaud – engineering
 Nicolas Vernhes – engineering

Release history

References

External links 
 

1998 albums
Dogbowl albums